Yelizaveta Osipovna Belogradskaya (1739 – ca. 1764 [?]) was a Russian Imperial Court opera singer and composer for keyboard.

She was born in St. Petersburg in 1739, the daughter of Osip Bilohradsky, a court singer and choral conductor, and niece of Timofiy Bilohradsky, the court lute player. She was a kammermädchen at the court of the Empress Elizaveta Petrovna.

In 1753 she performed the part of Procris in Francesco Araja's opera Cephalus and Procris, which was the first opera set in Russian, with the text by Aleksandr Sumarokov. She sang in G.P. Raupach's "The Refuge of Virtue" and "Alcesta". She appeared at court concerts and festivities as a singer and harpsichord player. Extant are her "Variations on a theme by Starzer" for keyboard. She died around 1764 and was interred at the Alexander Nevsky Lavra.

References

Source (in Russian)
 Светлов С. Ф. Русская опера в XVIII столетии // Ежегодник императорских театров. Сезон 1897/1898 гг. СПб., 1899. Прил. Кн. 2. С. 94.

1739 births
1760s deaths
18th-century keyboardists
18th-century women opera singers from the Russian Empire
Harpsichordists from the Russian Empire
Russian operatic sopranos
Sopranos from the Russian Empire
Singers from Saint Petersburg
Date of birth unknown
Place of death missing
Courtiers from the Russian Empire
Court of Elizabeth of Russia